Kyle Borland (born July 5, 1961) is a former linebacker for the Los Angeles Rams during the 1987 NFL season. He played at the collegiate level with the Wisconsin Badgers.

References

People from Denison, Iowa
People from Fort Atkinson, Wisconsin
Players of American football from Iowa
Players of American football from Wisconsin
Michigan Panthers players
New Jersey Generals players
Los Angeles Rams players
Wisconsin Badgers football players
American football linebackers
1961 births
Living people
National Football League replacement players